A list of films produced in Iran ordered by year of release in the 1960s. For an alphabetical list of Iranian films see :Category:Iranian films

1960s

External links
 Iranian film at the Internet Movie Database

1960s
Lists of 1960s films
Films